Pallavi Tiwari is an Indian American biomedical engineer who is a professor at the University of Wisconsin–Madison. Her research considers the development of computer algorithms to accelerate the diagnosis and treatment of disease. She was elected Fellow of the National Academy of Inventors.

Early life and education 
Tiwari is from India. She said that her parents always encouraged her to study science, and valued higher education. She attended the Kendriya Vidyalaya high school, and moved to the Shri Govindram Seksaria Institute of Technology and Science for undergraduate studies. She became inspired by biomedical engineering whilst she was at college, developing wearable technologies to help people with visible impairments. She moved to Rutgers University for her doctoral research, where she worked with a surgeon to analyze human error in surgery.

Research and career 
At Case Western Reserve University, Tiwari built machine learning algorithms that could accelerate the diagnosis of disease from medical images. In particular, Tiwari creates artificial intelligence tools to assess magnetic resonance imaging data and determine whether body tissue contains malignancies. At Case Western, she served as Director of the Brain Image Computing (BrIC) Laboratory.

Tiwari joined the University of Wisconsin–Madison in 2022, where she was made co-director of the UW Carbone Cancer Center.

Awards and honors 
 2018 Crain's Business Cleveland Forty Under 40
 2020 Johnson & Johnson Women in STEM2D Scholars Award
 2021 Society for Imaging Informatics in Medicine
 2023 Elected Fellow of the National Academy of Inventors

Selected publications

References 

Year of birth missing (living people)
Living people
Indian emigrants to the United States
American biomedical engineers
American women engineers
21st-century American engineers
21st-century women engineers
Rutgers University alumni
Case Western Reserve University faculty
University of Wisconsin–Madison faculty
Fellows of the National Academy of Inventors